The 1990 Harlow District Council election took place on 3 May 1990 to elect members of Harlow District Council in Essex, England. This was on the same day as other local elections. The Labour Party retained control of the council, which it had held continuously since the council's creation in 1973.

Election result

All comparisons in vote share are to the corresponding 1986 election.

Ward results

Brays Grove

Hare Street and Town Centre

Katherines With Sumner

Kingsmoor

Latton Bush

Little Parndon

Mark Hall North

Mark Hall South (2 seats)

Netteswell West

Old Harlow

Passmores

Potter Street

Stewards

Tye Green

References

1990
1990 English local elections
1990s in Essex